Beyond Saturday Night is the first album by Leslie Phillips, released in 1983 on Myrrh Records. The album's style is placed between the contemporary Christian music artist Amy Grant, Christian rocker Margaret Becker and hard rock group, Resurrection Band.

Track listing 

All songs written by Leslie Phillips, except where noted.

Side one
 "Hourglass"  – 3:33
 "Gina" (Leslie Phillips, Matthew Chapman, Purvis Orso)  – 3:36
 "Put Your Heart In Me"  – 4:05
 "I'm Finding"  – 3:26
 "Beyond Saturday Night" (John Fischer)  – 4:30

Side two
 "Bring Me Through"  – 4:49
 "Heart of Hearts" (Mark Heard)  – 3:16
 "Will They Love Him" (Leslie Phillips, Daniel Brown)  – 4:34
 "He's Gonna Hear You Crying"  – 3:14
 "Let Me Give"  – 3:47

Personnel 
 Leslie Phillips – lead vocals, backing vocals 
 Robbie Buchanan – keyboards
 John Hobbs – keyboards, synthesizers
 John Andrew Schreiner – keyboards, synthesizers
 Michael Landau – guitars
 Randy Thomas – guitars
 Leland Sklar – bass 
 Nathan East – bass 
 Carlos Vega – drums
 Bob Carlisle – backing vocals 
 Bryan Duncan – backing vocals

Production 
 Doug Corbin – executive producer 
 Jack Joseph Puig – producer, recording 
 David Schober – assistant engineer 
 Mike Reese – mastering 
 Doug Sax – mastering 
 Susan Pyron – production coordinator 
 Steve Elowe – album design 
 Paul Gross – album design 
 Ronald E. Garman – sleeve layout and design 
 Design Oasis – hand tinting 
 Aaron Rapoport – photography 
 Leslie Phillips – liner notes 
 David Seay – liner notes 

Studios
 Recorded at Bill Schnee Studios and Mama Jo's Studios (North Hollywood, California); Goldmine West (Beverly Hills, California).
 Mastered at The Mastering Lab (Hollywood, California).

Radio Singles

References 

1983 debut albums
Sam Phillips (musician) albums
Myrrh Records albums
Word Records albums